The 1989 Campeon de Campeones was the 36th edition of this Mexican Super Cup football match played by:

 League winners: América
 Cup winners: Toluca

Was played on July 20, 1989, at México DF, in a single match, to extra time.

Match details

References
Mexico - Statistics of season 1988/1989. (RSSSF)
Mexico - Statistics of Mexican Supercup. (RSSSF)

Cam
Campeón de Campeones
July 1989 sports events in Mexico